Ranja is a 2014 Sri Lankan Sinhala action thriller film directed by Sudesh Wasantha Peiris and produced by Sunil T. Fernando for Sunil T. Films. It was distributed as the sequel of Ranjan Ramanayake's film One Shot One in 2005. It stars Ranjan Ramanayake, Tennyson Cooray, and Himali Siriwardena in lead roles along with Roger Seneviratne, Srimal Wedisinghe and Rex Kodippili. It is the 1207th Sri Lankan film in the Sinhala cinema. The movie is a remake of 2003 Tamil movie Dhool.

Plot

Ranja (Ranjan Ramanayake) along with Vihangi (Himali Siriwardena) and her mother (Nilmini Kottegoda) come to the Colombo city to meet the minister (Srimal Wedisinghe) they've elected to the parliament to hand over a petition about a factory in their village which poisons village river. All three of them stay at Ranja's childhood friend Jonny's (Tennison Cooray) house at Colombo. Meanwhile, a local goon named Swarna (Piumi Boteju) and her brother Kalu Vijay (Wasantha Kumaravila) involved in many illegal activities in the area with the backing of the minister. One day, Vihangi accidentally collides with Kalu Vijay following which he tries to beat her but is saved by Ranja. Ranja and Kalu Vijay get involves in a heated argument which makes Kalu Vijay angry towards Ranja.

Cast
 Ranjan Ramanayake as Ranja / Ranjan
 Tennyson Cooray as Jonny
 Himali Siriwardena as Vihangi
 Srimal Wedisinghe as Minister
 Roger Seneviratne as Sub Inspector
 Wasantha Kumaravila as Kalu Vijay
 Piumi Boteju as Swarna
 Nipuni Wilson as Taniya
 Rex Kodippili as OIC
 Denuwan Senadhi as Tommy
 Nilmini Kottegoda as Aunty
 Sandun Wijesiri as Grama Sevaka
 Sumane Gomez as Shakila
 Premadasa Vithanage as Minister secretary

Soundtrack

Awards
 Award for the Best Visual Effects - 2014 Derana Film Awards
 Award for the Best Stunt Coordinator - 2014 Derana Film Awards

References

2014 films
2010s Sinhala-language films
Remakes of Sri Lankan films